The Pianoman at Christmas is the ninth studio album by British jazz musician Jamie Cullum, released through Island on 20 November 2020. The album peaked at number eleven on the UK Albums Chart.

Background
The album was recorded at Abbey Road Studios in Studio 2 and features fifty-seven of the UK's best musicians. The album was produced by Greg Wells.

Singles
"Turn on the Lights" was released as the lead single from the album on 9 October 2020. "Hang Your Lights" was released as the second single from the album on 6 November 2020.

Track listing
All tracks are written by Jamie Cullum, except where noted. All tracks are produced by Greg Wells, Jamie Cullum and Tom Richards, except where noted.

Charts

References

2020 albums
Jamie Cullum albums